William Bronzoni (27 July 1927 – 1 September 1987) was an Italian football player, who operated as a forward. He was born in Bibbiano, Italy.

Playing career
Bronzoni started career his in 1945 with Parma, where he played in Serie B and Serie C. He played 201 matches and scored 78 league goals, which remains a club record to this day. He also captained the club. He failed to live re-create his early years at Parma at any other club on a consistent basis, although he did win the Serie C title with Livorno in 1955. and eventually retired in 1962, having scored 28 career goals in 106 Serie B matches and 107 in 252 in Serie C.

References

1927 births
Sportspeople from Reggio Emilia
Italian footballers
Serie B players
Parma Calcio 1913 players
A.S. Sambenedettese players
U.S. Livorno 1915 players
Spezia Calcio players
1987 deaths
Association football forwards
A.S.D. Fanfulla players
Footballers from Emilia-Romagna